Miflin is an unincorporated community in Baldwin County, Alabama, United States. The Swift Presbyterian Church, which is listed on the National Register of Historic Places, is located in Miflin. A post office operated under the name Miflin from 1907 to 1951. The community is likely named after the Miflin family, who owned land in the area.

References

Unincorporated communities in Baldwin County, Alabama
Unincorporated communities in Alabama